Achilleas Papadimitriou (born 18 August 1980) is a former Greek volleyball player. He was part of the Greece men's national volleyball team. He competed at the 2009 Men's European Volleyball Championship. He played for the Olympiacos club between 2007 and 2009 and for the Panathinaikos club between 2009 and 2011.

References

External links
 

1980 births
Living people
Greek men's volleyball players
Olympiacos S.C. players
Place of birth missing (living people)
People from Amaliada
Sportspeople from Western Greece